Novotroitskoye is a rural locality (a selo) and the administrative center of Novotroitsky Selsoviet of Blagoveshchensky District, Amur Oblast, Russia. The population was 897 as of 2018. There are 24 streets.

Geography 
Novotroitskoye is located 29 km north of Blagoveshchensk (the district's administrative centre) by road. Belogorye is the nearest rural locality.

References 

Rural localities in Blagoveshchensky District, Amur Oblast